Visitors on The Icy Mountain is a Chinese contemporary classical opera composed by Lei Lei after the plot and songs of the 1963 film of the same name.

References

Operas
2014 operas
Chinese western-style operas
Xinjiang in fiction
Operas by Lei Lei
Operas based on films